Baamba may refer to:
 Baamba, the Amba people of Uganda and the Democratic Republic of the Congo
 "Baamba", the stage name of Stephen Albert (actor) of Australia